ISO 3166-2:KR is the entry for South Korea (officially the Republic of Korea) in ISO 3166-2, part of the ISO 3166 standard published by the International Organization for Standardization (ISO), which defines codes for the names of the principal subdivisions (e.g., provinces or states) of all countries coded in ISO 3166-1.

Currently for South Korea, ISO 3166-2 codes are defined for 1 special city, 6 metropolitan cities, 8 provinces, 1 special self-governing province, and 1 special self-governing city. All of them are province-level subdivisions.

Each code consists of two parts, separated by a hyphen. The second part is two digits:
 11: special city
 26–31: metropolitan cities
 41–48: provinces
 49: special self-governing province
 50: special self-governing city

Current codes
Subdivision names are listed as in the ISO 3166-2 standard published by the ISO 3166 Maintenance Agency (ISO 3166/MA).

Click on the button in the header to sort each column.

 Notes

Changes
The following changes to the entry have been announced in newsletters by the ISO 3166/MA since the first publication of ISO 3166-2 in 1998:

See also
 Subdivisions of South Korea
 FIPS region codes of South Korea

External links
 ISO Online Browsing Platform: KR
 Provinces of South Korea, Statoids.com

2:KR
ISO 3166-2
South Korea geography-related lists